Carlos Josafat Ramos Ibarra (born December 12, 1986 in Celaya, Guanajuato) is a former Mexican professional footballer who last played for Venados of Ascenso MX.

References

External links

Liga MX players
Living people
1986 births
Mexican footballers
People from Celaya
Association football defenders
Club Celaya footballers
Club Necaxa footballers
Correcaminos UAT footballers
Venados F.C. players
Atlético Zacatepec footballers
Atlético San Luis footballers